Huncherange is a small town in the commune of Bettembourg, in southern Luxembourg.  , the town has a population of 591. 

There is a watermill there, formerly the site of an old castle. According to a story recorded in the nineteenth century, the place is haunted by two women in white. The church is built 1903.

Bettembourg
Towns in Luxembourg